Bangladesh Bank Building is a high-rise building  located in Dhaka, Bangladesh. It is located in Motijheel, the central business district. It houses the headquarters of Bangladesh Bank. The building is one of the earliest high-rise in the city. It was the tallest building in Bangladesh for 27 years. Currently, it is the fourth tallest building in Bangladesh.

See also
 List of tallest buildings in Dhaka
 List of tallest buildings in Bangladesh

References

Buildings and structures in Dhaka
Skyscraper office buildings in Bangladesh
Motijheel Thana
Office buildings completed in 1985
Bank buildings in Bangladesh